Uwe Stöver (born February 8, 1967) is a German former footballer who became a coach. He was athletic director for SV Wehen Wiesbaden until March 2009.

Honours
 DFB-Pokal winner: 1993.

References

1967 births
Living people
German footballers
German football managers
Bayer 04 Leverkusen players
VfL Bochum players
1. FSV Mainz 05 players
Bundesliga players
Association football defenders